Petr Migunov (born August 24, 1974) is a Russian opera and classical singer (bass) who graduated from the Saint Petersburg Conservatory and was a winner of both the Tokyo and Salzburg Competitions in 1997 and 1999 respectively. He is well known for his performances as the bass soloist in Beethoven's Ninth Symphony as well as in the requiems of Mozart and Faure. He is also known for his singing of operatic bass roles such as Mephistopheles in Faust, Prince Gremin in Eugene Onegin, René in Iolanta and Don Iñigo in L'heure espagnole. In 2000 he performed at both Carnegie Hall and Lincoln Center Theater and since that time performs in Russia where he is a soloist of the Bolshoi Theatre.

References

Living people
1974 births
Operatic basses
Saint Petersburg Conservatory alumni
Singers from Saint Petersburg
21st-century Russian  male opera singers